Serhiy Svystun (born March 16, 1962, in Dushanbe) is a Soviet and Ukrainian football coach and former player who played as a forward.

Playing career 
Svystun played for the clubs FC Metalist Kharkiv, FC CSKA Kyiv, FC Shakhtar Donetsk, FC Lokomotiv Nizhny Novgorod, Diósgyőri VTK, Nyíregyháza Spartacus, FC Naftokhimik Kremenchuk, Rovenky and FC Hirnyk-Sport Komsomolsk.

Coaching career 
Svystun has been a manager for FC Adoms Kremenchuk, FC Atlant Kremenchuk, FC Kremin Kremenchuk. and FC Vorskla Reserves.

References

External links
 Profile at magyarfutball.hu

1962 births
Living people
Sportspeople from Dushanbe
Soviet footballers
Ukrainian footballers
Association football forwards
FC Metalist Kharkiv players
FC CSKA Kyiv players
FC Shakhtar Donetsk players
FC Lokomotiv Nizhny Novgorod players
Diósgyőri VTK players
Nagykanizsai SC footballers
FC Naftokhimik Kremenchuk players
FC Hirnyk Rovenky players
FC Hirnyk-Sport Horishni Plavni players
Ukrainian football managers
FC Adoms Kremenchuk managers
FC Kremin Kremenchuk managers
FC Vorskla Poltava managers
Ukrainian Premier League managers
Ukrainian expatriate footballers
Ukrainian expatriate sportspeople in Russia
Expatriate footballers in Russia
Ukrainian expatriate sportspeople in Hungary
Expatriate footballers in Hungary